Cowania may refer to:

 Cowania (plant), a flowering plant genus in family Rosaceae, often included within the genus Purshia
 Cowania (fly), a genus of fly in the family Tachinidae
 Cowania (butterfly), a gossamer-winged butterfly genus now called Ahmetia